Enrique Pereira (1 December 1909 – 10 March 1983) was a Uruguayan water polo player. He competed at the 1936 Summer Olympics and the 1948 Summer Olympics.

References

External links
 

1909 births
1983 deaths
Uruguayan male water polo players
Olympic water polo players of Uruguay
Water polo players at the 1936 Summer Olympics
Water polo players at the 1948 Summer Olympics
Sportspeople from Montevideo
20th-century Uruguayan people